Eresiomera cornesi, the Cornes' pearly, is a butterfly in the family Lycaenidae. It is found in western Nigeria. The habitat consists of forests.

References

Endemic fauna of Nigeria
Butterflies described in 1969
Poritiinae